The Expressway S2 Tunnel in Warsaw or Ursynów Tunnel is a highway tunnel, part of the S2 expressway in Warsaw.

The tunnel opened on December 20, 2021.

As of end of 2021, the tunnel is the longest road tunnel in Poland. From the west, the tunnel entry begins at Węzeł Ursynów Zachód junction. In the east, the tunnel joins the Węzeł Ursynów Wschód junction.

Specifications
The tunnel is around 2330 metres in length (some sources claim 2335 metres in length), and is built underneath the existing Warsaw Metro Line M1. Each of the two roadways has a width of 14.5 metres, with three traffic lanes each, and a hard shoulder 3.75 metres in width. Each roadway has a 1-metre wide emergency path.

References

Transport in Warsaw
Tunnels in Poland